Narrikup is a small town between Albany and Mount Barker in the Great Southern region of Western Australia. At the 2006 census, Narrikup had a population of 515.

The name Narrikup comes from the Aboriginal name of a nearby brook which is thought to mean "place of abundance".

The area was visited by Thomas Wilson who travelled from Albany in 1829 when he camped on the banks of the stream west of the current townsite.

The town is located on the Great Southern Railway line which was completed in this area in 1889, although initially the siding was named Hay River.

A reserve for the townsite was put aside in 1901 and in 1905 20 lots were surveyed; the townsite was finally gazetted in 1907.

References

External links
 Welcome to Narrikup (Albany Gateway)

Towns in Western Australia
Great Southern (Western Australia)